Torminalis is a plant genus that has sometimes been included within the genus Sorbus, as Section Torminaria. It includes at least one species, Torminalis clusii (Schönb.-Tem.) K.R.Robertson & J.B.Phipps (=Sorbus torminalis). The species originally described as Sorbus orientalis is either considered to be a synonym of T. clusii, or to be a second species, Torminalis orientalis (Schönb.-Tem.) K.R.Robertson & J.B.Phipps.

Taxonomy
It has recently become clear that the simple-leafed species traditionally included in Sorbus form a monophyletic group, and the species of Torminalis could be included in a clade called Aria (=genus Aria or Sorbus subgenus Aria).

References 

Trees of Europe